The North York Astros were a Canadian soccer team that was founded in 1990. The team initially played in the National Soccer League. The team played their home games at Esther Shiner Stadium in North York, a district of the city of Toronto, Canada. The team's colours were orange and black. The club was originally named North York Atletico Argentina Soccer Club, and witnessed instant success in its initial stages. After a merger with North York Talons, and a relocation to Scarborough the team was eventually renamed the North York Astros. The Astros were a founding member of the Canadian National Soccer League's successor league the Canadian Professional Soccer League in 1998.

North York's time in the CPSL (later renamed Canadian Soccer League) was marked with mixed results for example reaching the CPSL Championship finals then going through periods of consecutively failing to secure a postseason berth. In 2013, the Astros merged with Toronto Vasas organization to form Astros Vasas FC. The merger proved a success as the club rebuild itself and became a playoff contender. In 2014, the Canadian Soccer Association De-sanctioned the CSL, and as a result North York withdrew from the league in 2015.

History

Early years (1990–97)
Founded on November 23, 1990 as the North York Atletico Argentina Soccer Club and accepted into membership by the National Soccer League Board to participate in the 1991 NSL season. Lamport Stadium served as the club's first home field. Elio Garro  was appointed the club's first head coach. North York tasted success in their debut season as it went on to win the 1991 Peniche Pre-season Tournament over the North York Rockets of the Canadian Soccer League in penalty kicks after a 1–1 tie at Lamport Stadium, the 1991 NSL Ontario Cup over the Toronto Jets (2–0) and the NSL Canadian Cup Championship over the Montreal Dollard (3–2) at Claude Robillard Stadium in Montreal, Quebec.

In 1992, North York lost the Super Shield Cup Championship match to the Scarborough International Soccer Club by a score of 1–0. This NSL trophy was to determine the overall champion between the NSL League Champions and the NSL Canadian Cup Champions. For the second year in a row, the club reached the NSL Ontario Cup Finals but  suffered a 2–1 defeat to Toronto Croatia.

In 1993, the NSL Board accepted North York Rockets and Winnipeg Fury of the defunct CSL, renamed itself The Canadian National Soccer League (CNSL) to denote the National Status awarded by the Canadian Soccer Association. As a result, The CNSL Board, decided to relocate North York to Scarborough as part of its realignment. The North York Atletico Argentina Soccer Club Board decided on the name of the Scarborough Astros Soccer Club to associate itself to the new city and selected Birchmount Stadium as their new home field. Changes also occurred with team management as Jorge Armua was named head coach.
In 1995, the Astros roster consisted of three CNSL all-stars Paulo Silva, Rene Martin, Roosevelt Angulo, Rick Titus, Patrick Tobo and Iraqi international Basil Gorgis. Throughout the season the club achieved an undefeated run in the Umbro Cup tournament. In the Umbro Cup finals Scarborough faced St. Catharines Wolves, but suffered a loss in a penalty shootout. At the CNSL awards banquet Laszlo Martonfi received the Golden Boot award for finishing as the league's top goalscorer with 12 goals.

Merger and CPSL founding member (1997-98)
In 1997, Scarborough Astros merged with North York Talons and combined both of their rosters together. One notable addition to the roster was the signing of Diego Maradona's younger brother Lalo Maradona. Unfortunately for the club midway through the season the CNSL board suspended North York, and Hamilton White Eagles for the remainder of the 1997 season. The following year the CNSL merged with the stillborn Ontario Professional Soccer League, and formed the Canadian Professional Soccer League. The newly formed CPSL Board accepted into membership as part of this merger, North York Talons, London City, Toronto Croatia and St. Catharines Roma and recognized them as Founding Members. The CPSL would operate under the auspices and joint support of the OSA. The CPSL Board then accepted four new clubs namely, Glen Shields, York Region Shooters, Mississauga Eagles and Toronto Olympians. North York later agreed as requested by the CPSL Board to relocate to the North York permanently  and take on the name of North York Astros Soccer Club and Esther Shiner Stadium as their home field, to allow the Toronto Olympians to move into Scarborough and use Birchmount Stadium as their home field. In their debut season in the CPSL, the Astros qualified for the postseason by clinching the final playoff spot. In the postseason North York faced Toronto Olympians, but were defeated by a score of 5–1. At the CPSL awards banquet Rene Martin received the CPSL MVP award.

Decline & rebuilding period (1999–06)
In 1999, the Astros hired the services of Rafael Carbajal as head coach. For the two seasons which he coached he assembled a roster of players with European and NPSL experience. The acquisitions were O'Neil Brown, Platon Krivoshchyokov, Piotr Libicz, Ivan Jurisic, Sam Medeiros, Andrei Malychenkov. The signings were of no avail as the Astros failed to clinch a postseason berth in both seasons. One notable achievement went to Libicz as he was awarded the CPSL Goalkeeper of the Year in 2000. In preparations for the 2001 season the Astros brought in Tony LaFerrara to coach the team. LaFerrara brought in former Montreal Impact striker Dejan Gluscevic, Luciano Miranda and appointed veteran Alex Nardi as team captain. After a mediocre performance LaFerrara was replaced by assistant coach Sam Medeiros. Though North York's performance improved from the previous season it was still not enough to secure a playoff berth. Luciano Miranda received the CPSL Goalkeeper of the Year, and Kurt Ramsey the CPSL Defender of the Year.

Former Astros striker Dejan Gluscevic along with Pavel Zaslavski were appointed the co-head coaches for the 2002 season. Added to the squad were Guillermo Compton Hall, Gabriel Salguero. During the regular season the Astros performed poorly and finished fifth in the Western Conference. They received a playoff wild card match due to hosting the competition. Their opponents in the Wild Card Game were league powerhouse Mississauga Olympians, and out played them by a score of 3–0.  Their fairy tale continued in the semi-finals were they faced Western Conference champions Toronto Croatia, and once more beat the odds by winning on goal from Hall to cap off the match with a 1–0 victory. In the CPSL Championship finals North York faced Eastern Conference champions Ottawa Wizards, but fell short in capturing the title by losing by a score of 2–0. At the conclusion of the season Compton Hall received the CPSL Championship MVP, and Bruno Ierullo was awarded the CPSL President's award.

For the 2003 season Zaslavski received full head coach responsibilities, and signed former Toronto Lynx forward Francisco Dos Santos, Vitaliy Mishchenko, and Boris Krimus. The season concluded in another mediocre performance with the club finishing fifth in the Western Conference, and failing to secure a postseason berth. The 2003 season marked a rebuilding period for the club. Notable achievements which occurred during their rebuilding stage were Ierullo receiving his second President's award in 2004. In 2005, Gluscevic returned to coach the Astros once more, and managed to secure a postseason wild card match. In the match North York faced Toronto Croatia, but were eliminated from the competition by a score of 1–0. At the CPSL awards ceremony Gluscevic received the CPSL Coach of the Year, and North York was awarded the CPSL Fair Play Award.

Carbajal period (2007–08)
The 2007 season marked the return of Rafael Carbajal as head coach. His signings included former USL veteran David Diplacido, Haidar Al-Shaïbani, Selvin Lammie, and Diego Maradona (son of Lalo Maradona). Carbajal succeed in improving the team's performance, as the Astros qualified for the postseason for the first time since the 1998 season without the assistance of a bye to the playoffs. Their opponents in the first round of the playoffs were Toronto Croatia, after a 2–0 lead Croatia bounced back with four goals to eliminate North York from the competition. Team owner Ierullo was awarded the Harry Paul Gauss award for the third time in his career. In preparation for the 2008 season Carbajal reinforced his roster with the signings of Bahamian international Happy Hall, Go Nagaoka, Franco Lalli, Carlos Zeballos, and Anthony Bahadur. North York produced a fruitful season finishing as runner's up in the National Division, the club's highest finish in the CSL regular season. In the quarterfinals the Astros faced the Serbian White Eagles, but suffered a 2–1 defeat. CSL Coach of the Year went to Carbajal, and Zeballos received the Defender of the Year.

Postseason drought & merger (2009–14)
After the departure of Carbajal the Astros went through a difficult rebuilding era. North York went through the services of Uğur Çimen, Vladimir Klinovsky, Michael Ridout, and Gerardo Lezcano as head coaches. For four straight seasons the Astros finished at the bottom of the table. In 2010, the Astros reached an agreement with North York Hearts SC to serve as a feeder club. In May 2013 the club merged with Toronto Vasas organization to form Astros Vasas FC.László Kiss with experience in European soccer was appointed the new head coach. The Astros received additional reinforcements after acquiring the player rights from the Mississauga Eagles. Kiss assembled a roster of which consisted of Joey Melo, Igor Pisanjuk, and Erik Ľupták. In the initial stages of the season the team struggled to achieve results, which resulted in the replacement of Kiss with Lezcano as head coach. Lezcano managed to achieve enough results in order to make one last bold attempt at a postseason berth. Unfortunately the Astros fell short by one point in order to secure the final playoff berth.

In 2014, Josef Komlodi was appointed the head coach, and brought in CSL veterans like Gabe Gala, Boris Miličić, Mark Jankovic, and Jason Lopes. Midway through the season Komlodi resigned, and Igor Pisanjuk served in the capacity of player-coach. Pisanjuk managed the Astros to a postseason berth by finishing fourth in the overall standings. In the postseason the club faced Burlington SC, and advanced to the semi-finals by a 4–0 victory. In the second round of the playoffs North York faced York Region Shooters, but suffered a 1–0 defeat. On February 28, 2015 the CSL announced that North York, and Kingston FC were not returning for the 2015 season.

Awards

 1991 Peniche Pre-season Champions
 1991 NSL Ontario Cup Champions
 1991 Canada Cup Champions
 1992 NSL Ontario Cup Runners Up
 1992 NSL Super Shield Runners Up
 1995 CNSL Ontario Cup Runners Up
 2002 CPSL Rogers Cup Runners Up

Kit

The colours in the kit have changed over the years. Yellow and Navy Blue where prominent and in 2010 the Club added Orange and Black to commemorate its 20th anniversary.

Notable players

Canada
 Anthony Adur 
 Haidar Al-Shaïbani 
 Tomer Chencinski 
 Sergio De Luca 
 David Diplacido 
 Gabe Gala 
 Victor Gallo 
Felix Gelt
 Evan James 
 Franco Lalli 
 Joey Melo 
 David Monsalve 
 Peyvand Mossavat 
 Dominic Oppong 
 Igor Pisanjuk 
 Matt Silva 
 Gil Vainshtein
 Nelson Ryan Zamora 
Angola
 Edgar Bartolomeu 
Argentina
 Juan Cruz Real 
 Raúl Maradona 
 Gabriel Salguero 
Bahamas
 Happy Hall 
Brazil
 Francisco Dos Santos 
 Paulo Silva 

Cameroon
 Patrick Tobo 
Grenada
 Davier Walcott 
Guyana
 Konata Mannings 
Iraq
 Basil Gorgis 
Israel
 Alon Badat 
Namibia
 Maleagi Ngarizemo 
Russia
 Boris Krimus 
 Platon Krivoshchyokov 
 Andrei Malychenkov 
Serbia
 Dejan Gluščević 
 Ivan Jurisic 
 Boris Miličić 
Trinidad and Tobago
 Rick Titus 
Ukraine
 Vladimir Koval 
 Vitaliy Mishchenko 
Uruguay
 Rafael Carbajal

Year-by-year

Head coaches

References

External links
 
 North York Astros

 
North York
Canadian National Soccer League teams
Canadian Soccer League (1998–present) teams
Soccer clubs in Toronto
Association football clubs established in 1990
1990 establishments in Ontario